The 2004–05 NBA season was the SuperSonics' 38th season in the National Basketball Association. After losing their season opener to the Los Angeles Clippers 114–84 on November 3, the Sonics went on a nine-game winning streak as they won 17 of their first 20 games. Despite losing eight of their final ten games, the Sonics finished first place in the Northwest Division with a solid 52–30 record, marking their first 50-plus win season since 1998, and first playoff appearance since 2002. Ray Allen led the team averaging 23.9 points per game as he, and Rashard Lewis were both voted to play in the 2005 NBA All-Star Game in Denver. In the first round of the playoffs, the Sonics defeated the Sacramento Kings in five games, but would lose in the second round to the eventual NBA champion San Antonio Spurs in six games. This would be their final playoff appearance as the Sonics. Following the season, head coach Nate McMillan left for the Portland Trail Blazers, and Antonio Daniels signed as a free agent with the Washington Wizards.

For this season, they added new yellow alternate road uniforms they remained in used until 2008.

Draft picks

Roster

Regular season

Season standings

Record vs. opponents

Game log

|- style="background:#fbb;"
| 1
| November 3
| @ L.A. Clippers
| L 84–114
| Rashard Lewis (24)
| Reggie Evans (6)
| Ray Allen (5)
| Staples Center13,371
| 0–1
|- style="background:#bfb;"
| 2
| November 5
| Atlanta
| W 106–85
| Ray Allen (25)
| Reggie Evans (9)
| Luke Ridnour (6)
| KeyArena16,103
| 1–1
|- style="background:#bfb;"
| 3
| November 7
| San Antonio
| W 113–94
| Rashard Lewis (27)
| Danny Fortson (13)
| Luke Ridnour (6)
| KeyArena15,891
| 2–1
|- style="background:#bfb;"
| 4
| November 9
| @ Denver
| W 108–88
| Ray Allen (30)
| Reggie Evans (14)
| Luke Ridnour (11)
| Pepsi Center12,962
| 3–1
|- style="background:#bfb;"
| 5
| November 10
| Sacramento
| W 108–78
| Ray Allen (20)
| Danny Fortson (13)
| Antonio Daniels (6)
| KeyArena14,355
| 4–1
|- style="background:#bfb;"
| 6
| November 12
| Toronto
| W 88–87
| Ray Allen (29)
| Reggie Evans (16)
| Allen, Ridnour (7)
| KeyArena15,702
| 5–1
|- style="background:#bfb;"
| 7
| November 14
| Memphis
| W 118–113
| Ray Allen (34)
| Rashard Lewis (12)
| Luke Ridnour (8)
| KeyArena12,302
| 6–1
|- style="background:#bfb;"
| 8
| November 16
| @ Philadelphia
| W 103–95
| Ray Allen (37)
| Reggie Evans (11)
| Luke Ridnour (10)
| Wachovia Center15,589
| 7–1
|- style="background:#bfb;"
| 9
| November 17
| @ New Jersey
| W 79–68
| Rashard Lewis (17)
| Reggie Evans (7)
| Antonio Daniels (4)
| Continental Airlines Arena12,127
| 8–1
|- style="background:#bfb;"
| 10
| November 19
| @ Toronto
| W 101–94
| Rashard Lewis (27)
| Reggie Evans (11)
| Ray Allen (6)
| Air Canada Centre16,886
| 9–1
|- style="background:#fbb;"
| 11
| November 21
| @ Boston
| L 83–102
| Ray Allen (21)
| Reggie Evans (8)
| Ray Allen (6)
| FleetCenter15,410
| 9–2
|- style="background:#bfb;"
| 12
| November 23
| @ Minnesota
| W 103–92
| Rashard Lewis (27)
| Reggie Evans (9)
| Antonio Daniels (11)
| Target Center16,129
| 10–2
|- style="background:#bfb;"
| 13
| November 24
| @ Memphis
| W 93–84
| Rashard Lewis (27)
| Rashard Lewis (11)
| Allen, Ridnour (5)
| FedExForum15,542
| 11–2
|- style="background:#bfb;"
| 14
| November 26
| New Jersey
| W 92–79
| Danny Fortson (20)
| Reggie Evans (11)
| Luke Ridnour (5)
| KeyArena17,072
| 12–2
|- style="background:#bfb;"
| 15
| November 28
| Indiana
| W 103–95
| Rashard Lewis (22)
| Nick Collison (9)
| Ray Allen (9)
| KeyArena14,808
| 13–2
|- style="background:#fbb;"
| 16
| November 30
| @ Portland
| L 94–100
| Rashard Lewis (29)
| Reggie Evans (10)
| Luke Ridnour (10)
| Rose Garden15,128
| 13–3

|- style="background:#bfb;"
| 17
| December 1
| Utah
| W 129–119 (OT)
| Ray Allen (38)
| Danny Fortson (9)
| Luke Ridnour (10)
| KeyArena16,066
| 14–3
|- style="background:#bfb;"
| 18
| December 4
| Portland
| W 99–89
| Radmanović, Lewis (20)
| Vladimir Radmanović (10)
| Antonio Daniels (6)
| KeyArena17,072
| 15–3
|- style="background:#bfb;"
| 19
| December 8
| @ San Antonio
| W 102–96
| Ray Allen (29)
| Vladimir Radmanović (7)
| Antonio Daniels (4)
| SBC Center18,797
| 16–3
|- style="background:#bfb;"
| 20
| December 9
| @ Dallas
| W 107–102
| Rashard Lewis (25)
| Lewis, Evans (9)
| Luke Ridnour (7)
| American Airlines Center19,733
| 17–3
|- style="background:#fbb;"
| 21
| December 11
| Boston
| L 84–98
| Rashard Lewis (19)
| Danny Fortson (11)
| Ray Allen (6)
| KeyArena17,072
| 17–4
|- style="background:#bfb;"
| 22
| December 14
| L.A. Lakers
| W 108–93
| Rashard Lewis (37)
| Lewis, Radmanović (7)
| Luke Ridnour (11)
| KeyArena17,072
| 18–4
|- style="background:#fbb;"
| 23
| December 17
| Phoenix
| L 110–112
| Ray Allen (32)
| Reggie Evans (14)
| Luke Ridnour (9)
| KeyArena17,072
| 18–5
|- style="background:#bfb;"
| 24
| December 22
| Denver
| W 98–83
| Rashard Lewis (21)
| Reggie Evans (12)
| Luke Ridnour (5)
| KeyArena17,072
| 19–5
|- style="background:#bfb;"
| 25
| December 27
| @ Utah
| W 98–88
| Rashard Lewis (22)
| Nick Collison (7)
| Luke Ridnour (6)
| Delta Center19,911
| 20–5
|- style="background:#fbb;"
| 26
| December 28
| Philadelphia
| L 107–114
| Ray Allen (32)
| Fortson, Lewis, Collison (6)
| Luke Ridnour (9)
| KeyArena17,072
| 20–6
|- style="background:#bfb;"
| 27
| December 30
| @ Atlanta
| W 94–79
| Ray Allen (20)
| Nick Collison (11)
| Luke Ridnour (5)
| Philips Arena13,336
| 21–6
|- style="background:#bfb;"
| 28
| December 31
| @ Charlotte
| W 103–97
| Rashard Lewis (27)
| Reggie Evans (10)
| Daniels, Ridnour (7)
| Charlotte Coliseum13,696
| 22–6

|- style="background:#bfb;"
| 29
| January 3
| @ Miami
| W 98–96
| Ray Allen (35)
| Rashard Lewis (13)
| Luke Ridnour (7)
| American Airlines Arena20,284
| 23–6
|- style="background:#fbb;"
| 30
| January 5
| @ Orlando
| L 87–105
| Ray Allen (30)
| Rashard Lewis (11)
| Luke Ridnour (5)
| TD Waterhouse Centre13,305
| 23–7
|- style="background:#fbb;"
| 31
| January 6
| @ Washington
| L 97–106
| Rashard Lewis (35)
| Rashard Lewis (11)
| Luke Ridnour (10)
| MCI Center16,230
| 23–8
|- style="background:#bfb;"
| 32
| January 9
| Miami
| W 108–98
| Vladimir Radmanović (27)
| Danny Fortson (10)
| Daniels, Allen, Ridnour (7)
| KeyArena17,072
| 24–8
|- style="background:#bfb;"
| 33
| January 11
| L.A. Clippers
| W 104–99
| Ray Allen (31)
| Reggie Evans (9)
| Luke Ridnour (11)
| KeyArena15,001
| 25–8
|- style="background:#fbb;"
| 34
| January 12
| @ L.A. Clippers
| L 92–103
| Ray Allen (22)
| Reggie Evans (10)
| Ray Allen (8)
| Staples Center15,802
| 25–9
|- style="background:#bfb;"
| 35
| January 14
| Golden State
| W 103–84
| Ray Allen (22)
| Danny Fortson (11)
| Daniels, Ridnour (6)
| KeyArena16,519
| 26–9
|- style="background:#bfb;"
| 36
| January 16
| Cleveland
| W 105–97
| Ray Allen (27)
| Vladimir Radmanović (11)
| Antonio Daniels (8)
| KeyArena17,072
| 27–9
|- style="background:#fbb;"
| 37
| January 18
| Denver
| L 110–116 (OT)
| Vladimir Radmanović (25)
| Reggie Evans (10)
| Luke Ridnour (8)
| KeyArena15,555
| 27–10
|- style="background:#fbb;"
| 38
| January 21
| Minnesota
| L 107–112
| Ray Allen (25)
| Vladimir Radmanović (10)
| Allen, Daniels (4)
| KeyArena17,072
| 27–11
|- style="background:#bfb;"
| 39
| January 23
| Utah
| W 122–105
| Rashard Lewis (36)
| Reggie Evans (10)
| Antonio Daniels (8)
| KeyArena16,823
| 28–11
|- style="background:#bfb;"
| 40
| January 25
| @ L.A. Lakers
| W 104–93
| Vladimir Radmanović (26)
| Reggie Evans (13)
| Luke Ridnour (7)
| Staples Center18,997
| 29–11
|- style="background:#fbb;"
| 41
| January 26
| @ Utah
| L 100–109
| Ray Allen (27)
| Nick Collison (8)
| Luke Ridnour (4)
| Delta Center18,821
| 29–12
|- style="background:#bfb;"
| 42
| January 28
| @ Golden State
| W 88–85
| Ray Allen (26)
| Reggie Evans (17)
| Allen, Daniels (3)
| The Arena in Oakland18,821
| 30–12
|- style="background:#fbb;"
| 43
| January 31
| San Antonio
| L 84–103
| Daniels, Radmanović, Murray (13)
| James, Lewis, Evans (6)
| Antonio Daniels (5)
| KeyArena17,072
| 30–13

|- style="background:#bfb;"
| 44
| February 1
| @ Sacramento
| W 106–101
| Rashard Lewis (24)
| Reggie Evans (15)
| Luke Ridnour (5)
| ARCO Arena17,317
| 31–13
|- style="background:#bfb;"
| 45
| February 5
| Charlotte
| W 113–99
| Ray Allen (25)
| Reggie Evans (21)
| Luke Ridnour (8)
| KeyArena16,901
| 32–13
|- style="background:#bfb;"
| 46
| February 8
| New Orleans
| W 108–91
| Ray Allen (26)
| Reggie Evans (14)
| Luke Ridnour (7)
| KeyArena15,482
| 33–13
|- style="background:#bfb;"
| 47
| February 10
| Sacramento
| W 115–107
| Ray Allen (34)
| Reggie Evans (12)
| Luke Ridnour (5)
| KeyArena16,629
| 34–13
|- style="background:#bfb;"
| 48
| February 11
| @ Phoenix
| W 113–105
| Rashard Lewis (23)
| Reggie Evans (11)
| Luke Ridnour (5)
| America West Arena18,422
| 35–13
|- style="background:#fbb;"
| 49
| February 13
| Dallas
| L 92–95
| Rashard Lewis (18)
| Reggie Evans (12)
| Luke Ridnour (8)
| KeyArena17,072
| 35–14
|- style="background:#fbb;"
| 50
| February 16
| Golden State
| L 110–117
| Ray Allen (26)
| Nick Collison (12)
| Ray Allen (7)
| KeyArena15,705
| 35–15
|- style="text-align:center;"
| colspan="9" style="background:#bbcaff;"|All-Star Break
|- style="background:#bfb;"
| 51
| February 22
| @ Houston
| W 87–85
| Ray Allen (29)
| Reggie Evans (11)
| Luke Ridnour (7)
| Toyota Center17,239
| 36–15
|- style="background:#bfb;"
| 52
| February 23
| @ New Orleans
| W 103–85
| Rashard Lewis (26)
| Reggie Evans (14)
| Luke Ridnour (9)
| New Orleans Arena12,771
| 37–15
|- style="background:#bfb;"
| 53
| February 25
| Minnesota
| W 98–88
| Ray Allen (32)
| Vitaly Potapenko (8)
| Ray Allen (6)
| KeyArena17,072
| 38–15
|- style="background:#fbb;"
| 54
| February 27
| @ Milwaukee
| L 73–99
| Ray Allen (16)
| Reggie Evans (12)
| Luke Ridnour (3)
| Bradley Center17,112
| 38–16

|- style="background:#bfb;"
| 55
| March 1
| @ Indiana
| W 101–93
| Rashard Lewis (30)
| Reggie Evans (12)
| Daniels, Ridnour (4)
| Conseco Fieldhouse14,971
| 39–16
|- style="background:#bfb;"
| 56
| March 2
| @ Cleveland
| W 103–86
| Ray Allen (31)
| Radmanović, Fortson (7)
| Luke Ridnour (5)
| Gund Arena17,522
| 40–16
|- style="background:#bfb;"
| 57
| March 4
| Detroit
| W 95–87
| Rashard Lewis (18)
| Reggie Evans (12)
| Allen, Ridnour (6)
| KeyArena17,072
| 41–16
|- style="background:#fbb;"
| 58
| March 6
| Phoenix
| L 99–110
| Ray Allen (27)
| Rashard Lewis (11)
| Luke Ridnour (4)
| KeyArena17,072
| 41–17
|- style="background:#fbb;"
| 59
| March 8
| Houston
| L 95–97
| Ray Allen (32)
| Reggie Evans (8)
| Luke Ridnour (12)
| KeyArena17,072
| 41–18
|- style="background:#fbb;"
| 60
| March 11
| Chicago
| L 97–100
| Rashard Lewis (27)
| Reggie Evans (11)
| Luke Ridnour (6)
| KeyArena17,072
| 41–19
|- style="background:#bfb;"
| 61
| March 13
| @ New York
| W 90–80
| Rashard Lewis (23)
| Reggie Evans (16)
| Antonio Daniels (7)
| Madison Square Garden19,763
| 42–19
|- style="background:#bfb;"
| 62
| March 15
| @ Chicago
| W 99–93
| Rashard Lewis (30)
| Reggie Evans (19)
| Ray Allen (7)
| United Center21,762
| 43–19
|- style="background:#fbb;"
| 63
| March 16
| @ Detroit
| L 95–102
| Rashard Lewis (26)
| Allen, Radmanović (6)
| Luke Ridnour (5)
| The Palace of Auburn Hills22,076
| 43–20
|- style="background:#bfb;"
| 64
| March 18
| Orlando
| W 98–90
| Ray Allen (38)
| Nick Collison (10)
| Luke Ridnour (6)
| KeyArena17,072
| 44–20
|- style="background:#bfb;"
| 65
| March 20
| @ L.A. Lakers
| W 102–100
| Rashard Lewis (27)
| Rashard Lewis (11)
| Luke Ridnour (7)
| Staples Center18,997
| 45–20
|- style="background:#bfb;"
| 66
| March 22
| Milwaukee
| W 92–84
| Rashard Lewis (29)
| Nick Collison (7)
| Luke Ridnour (9)
| KeyArena16,197
| 46–20
|- style="background:#bfb;"
| 67
| March 24
| @ Portland
| W 96–91
| Damien Wilkins (21)
| Collison, Evans (9)
| Reggie Evans (4)
| Rose Garden17,019
| 47–20
|- style="background:#bfb;"
| 68
| March 25
| New York
| W 109–101 (OT)
| Ray Allen (40)
| Reggie Evans (10)
| Antonio Daniels (7)
| KeyArena17,072
| 48–20
|- style="background:#fbb;"
| 69
| March 27
| Washington
| L 94–95
| Ray Allen (27)
| Allen, Evans, Collison (8)
| Luke Ridnour (4)
| KeyArena16,333
| 48–21
|- style="background:#bfb;"
| 70
| March 29
| @ Memphis
| W 102–99
| Allen, James (22)
| Reggie Evans (13)
| Luke Ridnour (9)
| FedExForum17,256
| 49–21
|- style="background:#fbb;"
| 71
| March 30
| @ San Antonio
| L 76–89
| Flip Murray (17)
| Reggie Evans (12)
| Luke Ridnour (2)
| SBC Center18,797
| 49–22

|- style="background:#bfb;"
| 72
| April 1
| Portland
| W 89–87
| Ray Allen (19)
| Reggie Evans (13)
| Luke Ridnour (9)
| KeyArena17,072
| 50–22
|- style="background:#fbb;"
| 73
| April 3
| @ Golden State
| L 92–101
| Ray Allen (27)
| Ray Allen (9)
| Allen, Daniels (5)
| The Arena in Oakland17,296
| 50–23
|- style="background:#fbb;"
| 74
| April 5
| @ Sacramento
| L 101–122
| Ray Allen (23)
| Reggie Evans (12)
| Luke Ridnour (7)
| ARCO Arena17,317
| 50–24
|- style="background:#fbb;"
| 75
| April 8
| L.A. Lakers
| L 94–117
| Ray Allen (30)
| Collison, Evans (11)
| Flip Murray (7)
| KeyArena17,072
| 50–25
|- style="background:#fbb;"
| 76
| April 9
| @ Denver
| L 105–121
| Ray Allen (32)
| Reggie Evans (10)
| Luke Ridnour (7)
| Pepsi Center19,751
| 50–26
|- style="background:#fbb;"
| 77
| April 11
| Houston
| L 78–90
| Ray Allen (18)
| Nick Collison (8)
| Murray, Wilkins (4)
| KeyArena17,072
| 50–27
|- style="background:#fbb;"
| 78
| April 13
| Dallas
| L 90–95
| Ray Allen (19)
| Reggie Evans (13)
| Daniels, Ridnour (4)
| KeyArena16,502
| 50–28
|- style="background:#bfb;"
| 79
| April 15
| New Orleans
| W 97–72
| Ray Allen (32)
| Nick Collison (10)
| Ray Allen (7)
| KeyArena17,072
| 51–28
|- style="background:#bfb;"
| 80
| April 17
| @ Minnesota
| W 109–94
| Ray Allen (34)
| Ray Allen (10)
| Luke Ridnour (11)
| Target Center17,779
| 52–28
|- style="background:#fbb;"
| 81
| April 19
| @ Dallas
| L 96–101
| Allen, Lewis (21)
| Collison, Evans (9)
| Luke Ridnour (8)
| American Airlines Center20,534
| 52–29
|- style="background:#fbb;"
| 82
| April 20
| @ Houston
| L 78–106
| Flip Murray (22)
| Nick Collison (9)
| Luke Ridnour (8)
| Toyota Center18,194
| 52–30

Playoffs

|- align="center" bgcolor="#ccffcc"
| 1
| April 23
| Sacramento
| W 87–82
| Ray Allen (28)
| Evans, James (15)
| Daniels, Ridnour (4)
| KeyArena17,072
| 1–0
|- align="center" bgcolor="#ccffcc"
| 2
| April 26
| Sacramento
| W 105–93
| Ray Allen (26)
| Jerome James (9)
| Allen, Ridnour (6)
| KeyArena17,072
| 2–0
|- align="center" bgcolor="#ffcccc"
| 3
| April 29
| @ Sacramento
| L 104–116
| Ray Allen (33)
| Jerome James (9)
| Allen, Ridnour (5)
| ARCO Arena17,317
| 2–1
|- align="center" bgcolor="#ccffcc"
| 4
| May 1
| @ Sacramento
| W 115–102
| Ray Allen (45)
| James, Lewis (8)
| Allen, Daniels (6)
| ARCO Arena17,317
| 3–1
|- align="center" bgcolor="#ccffcc"
| 5
| May 3
| Sacramento
| W 122–118
| Ray Allen (30)
| Nick Collison (9)
| Antonio Daniels (8)
| KeyArena17,072
| 4–1
|-

|- align="center" bgcolor="#ffcccc"
| 1
| May 8
| @ San Antonio
| L 81–103
| Rashard Lewis (19)
| Collison, Evans (7)
| Luke Ridnour (4)
| SBC Center18,797
| 0–1
|- align="center" bgcolor="#ffcccc"
| 2
| May 10
| @ San Antonio
| L 91–108
| Ray Allen (25)
| Reggie Evans (12)
| Antonio Daniels (6)
| SBC Center18,797
| 0–2
|- align="center" bgcolor="#ccffcc"
| 3
| May 12
| San Antonio
| W 92–91
| Ray Allen (20)
| Rashard Lewis (10)
| Ray Allen (7)
| KeyArena17,072
| 1–2
|- align="center" bgcolor="#ccffcc"
| 4
| May 15
| San Antonio
| W 101–89
| Ray Allen (32)
| three players tied (6)
| Antonio Daniels (7)
| KeyArena17,072
| 2–2
|- align="center" bgcolor="#ffcccc"
| 5
| May 17
| @ San Antonio
| L 90–103
| Ray Allen (19)
| Danny Fortson (9)
| Ray Allen (6)
| SBC Center18,797
| 2–3
|- align="center" bgcolor="#ffcccc"
| 6
| May 19
| San Antonio
| L 96–98
| Ray Allen (25)
| Reggie Evans (9)
| Antonio Daniels (5)
| KeyArena17,072
| 2–4
|-

Player statistics

Season

Playoffs

Awards and records
 Ray Allen, All-NBA Second Team

Transactions

References

Seattle SuperSonics seasons